Herbert Tichy (1 June 1912 - 26 September 1987) was an Austrian writer, geologist, journalist and climber.

His first ascent of Cho Oyu was on 19 October 1954, with Sepp Jöchler and Pasang Dawa Lama.

References

See also
List of Austrian mountaineers

1912 births
1987 deaths
Austrian mountain climbers
Theodor Körner Prize recipients